Alexander Hart (October 1, 1839 – September 21, 1911) was a major in the Confederate Army during the American Civil War.

American Civil War
Hart hailed from New Orleans and commanded soldiers from the Fifth Louisiana Regiment during the war.

A veteran of many battles, Hart led troops in the Confederate victories at the Second Battle of Winchester (see Winchester II Confederate order of battle),  and Second Battle of Kernstown (which Hart noted in his journal).  Hart recorded in his journal that his regiment also participated in pushing back Union troops at the Battle of Smithfield Crossing.  During the Battle of Strasburg, Hart's regiment captured numerous Union troops.  Hart noted in his journal that his regiment "Captured a Lt. Col. And some dirty non-coms. Officers and men."

Some sources claim that Hart fought at the Battle of Monocacy (see Monocacy Confederate order of battle), but his journal makes no mention of this battle. Rather, Hart records traveling with his troops across Virginia on the date of the battle.

Hart also led his regiment at the Battle of Gettysburg. On the second day of the battle, Hart led the 5th Louisiana in a charge up East Cemetery Hill. Wounded in his left hand by the fire of the 107th Ohio Infantry, Hart was replaced in command of the regiment by Captain Thomas Briscoe of Company K. He spent the rest of the summer of 1863 recovering from his wound and was certified as permanently disabled in November. Hart mentions in his journal that he was injured in battle upon at least two occasions—first at Antietam and at the Battle of Opequon.

Simon Wolf's 1895 book, The American Jew as Patriot, Soldier and Citizen, notes that Hart first held the rank of a non-commissioned colonel before being commissioned as a major in 1863.

After returning to Confederate territory as part of a prisoner exchange, Hart later was assigned to the general staff of a Montgomery, Alabama-based General Williams.

Religious/Personal life
Hart was born in New Orleans, the oldest of Isaac and Julia Hart's twelve children.  He married his fiancée, Leonora Levy, (mentioned in his journal entry dated November 30, 1864, as "Leonna") in Richmond, Virginia, August 15, 1866, and had four children. (See the Hart family genealogy).

Two of Leonora's brothers also fought for the Confederacy, including Captain Ezekiel "Zeke" Levy and Isaac J. Levy, both of the 46th Virginia Infantry.  The latter was killed in action on Sunday, August 21, 1864, just shy of his twenty-second birthday. Isaac J. Levy's tombstone contains descriptions of his valor and commitment to his faith.  One such example of his adherence to the strictures of Jewish observance are contained in a letter to his sister, Leonora, in which he describes the observance of his last Passover in 1864.

Captain Ezekiel Levy is mentioned in Hart's diary's April 2, 1865, entry.  Hart's sister-in-law (Leonora's sister), Sarah Levy, married Corporal Edwin I. Kursheedt, a soldier in the Louisiana Washington Artillery battalion.

Many Jewish soldiers are listed as having fought under Hart in The American Jew as Patriot, Soldier and Citizen. Among the Jewish officers who fought in the Louisiana Fifth were Lieutenant L.S. Lipman, who died in battle May 9, 1863, and is buried in the Cemetery for Hebrew Confederate Soldiers in Richmond, Virginia, and Captain David Cohen Labatt.  About Labatt, the book notes that "...in consequence of severe illness, contracted in the service, resulting in chronic asthma, Captain Labat was compelled to resign his commission, J. Bankhead Magruder, the General commanding, endorsed the Captain's letter of resignation with the words: 'Captain Labat's resignation is a loss to the public service.'"

It is probable that, while in New Orleans, Hart worshiped at the Shangarai Chasset (Gates of Mercy) congregation. (In 1873 this congregation merged with another New Orleans Jewish congregation to form the present-day New Orleans Touro Synagogue.)  In his journal, while leaving Richmond by train on April 2, 1865, Hart mentions that "Be. Florance was...there."  A Benjamin Florance (as well as an Isaac Hart, likely his father) are listed among the founding trustees of that New Orleans synagogue in the December 1843 issue of the Occident and American Jewish Advocate.

Hart briefly writes in his journal about his observance of the Passover holiday during 1865 en route to serve General Williams.

Hart settled after the war in Staunton, Virginia, where, in 1876, he continued the family's commitment to Jewish community by organizing and becoming the founding president of the Temple House of Israel synagogue, a position he held for eighteen years.  The building which housed Hart's original congregation still stands in central Staunton.

As the Jewish community in nearby Harrisonburg, Virginia, became more organized and established a Sunday school for the young, Hart provided guidance. John Wayland, in his History of Rockingham County (c. 1912) writes that in 1890 "Major Hart of Staunton..." confirmed the first class in the congregation's "...new place of worship."

Robert Rosen, in The Jewish Confederates, notes that after living in Staunton, Hart moved to Norfolk, Virginia.  He was active in the Confederate War Veterans, serving as a commander in the Pickett-Buchanan Camp in Norfolk.  Hart was reported to have led services in the Ohef Sholom Temple  when the rabbi was absent.  Hart died in ten days shy of his seventy-second birthday, and was buried in Norfolk.  His tombstone reads "Major Alexander Hart, 5th La. Inf. C.S.A."

References

Citations

Bibliography

External links
  Alexander Hart's Civil War  Sword and Scabbard Shapell Manuscript Foundation
  Alexander Hart (1839-1911) Find A Grave memorial

1839 births
1911 deaths
People from New Orleans
Confederate States Army officers
Jewish-American history
Jewish Confederates
Jewish American military personnel
Louisiana Tigers
American Civil War prisoners of war
People of Louisiana in the American Civil War